Moncheaux-lès-Frévent (literally Moncheaux near Frévent) is a commune in the Pas-de-Calais department in the Hauts-de-France region of France.

Geography

Population

Places of interest
 The church of St.Martin, dating from the eighteenth century.
 Two 17th century manor houses.

See also
Communes of the Pas-de-Calais department

References

Moncheauxlesfrevent